John Currie Bruno Jr. (September 10, 1964 – April 13, 1992) was an American football punter who played one season for the Pittsburgh Steelers of the NFL. He was selected in the fifth round of the 126th pick in the 1987 NFL Draft and played college football at Penn State for the Penn State Nittany Lions football where he won the national championship in 1986, the Fiesta Bowl in 1987, and the Aloha Bowl in 1983.

Personal life
John Bruno Jr. was born on September 10, 1964 in Jeannette, Pennsylvania. He stood at 6'2, 190 pounds. In December 1991, he was diagnosed with skin cancer. He died on April 13, 1992, in Pittsburgh, Pennsylvania. The funeral was held at First Presbyterian Church in Irwin, Pennsylvania.

References

1964 births
1992 deaths
People from Jeannette, Pennsylvania
Players of American football from Pennsylvania
Sportspeople from the Pittsburgh metropolitan area
American football punters
Pittsburgh Steelers players
Penn State Nittany Lions football players
National Football League replacement players